The mixed team recurve competition in archery at the 2021 Islamic Solidarity Games was held from 15 to 17 August at the Saraçoğlu Sport Complex  in Konya.

Qualification round
Results after 144 arrows:

Elimination round
Source:

References

Mixed team recurve